Brandon Laatsch is an American game developer, filmmaker, and YouTuber known for directing Video Game High School, founding the game company Stress Level Zero, and other online video content.

Early life 
Laatsch went to high school with Corridor Digital founders Niko Pueringer and Sam Gorski. Laatsch studied sociology at University of Southern California (USC).

Career

Video work with Freddie Wong 
Laatsch met Freddie Wong at USC in 2004. They uploaded their first video Aces onto YouTube in 2006. It was a comedy-action short film about a poker game that turns to gunplay.

Laatsch and Wong worked with Corridor Digital.

Laatsch and Wong quit their jobs in 2010 to focus on YouTube full-time. Prior to this move, they did freelance VFX and worked on direct-to-video films. They made videos out of a shared loft in Downtown Los Angeles. Their videos are inspired by a variety of video games, such as Mario Kart and Portal, and employ special effects.

Jon Favreau recruited the pair to help with the digital marketing campaign for his film, Cowboys & Aliens (2011), after having seen their videos from his 10-year old son. Through Favreau, the pair were allowed to use the Universal Studios Lot and props from Cowboys & Aliens in their short film.

They made appearances on Jimmy Kimmel Live! in September 2011.

Laatsch and Wong launched RocketJump.com in 2012.

In 2014, Laatsch started a Kickstarter to crowdfund a feature film based on Minecraft for US$600,000. The project was cancelled by Mojang over IP concerns.

Stress Level Zero 

Laatsch and Wong parted ways in 2013, with Wong focusing on Video Game High School and Laatsch pivoting into video game production. Through his game studio Stress Level Zero, Laatsch released the VR game Hover Junkers in April 2016 on HTC Vive. In 2016, Chinese game publisher FunPlus invested an undisclosed amount of venture capital in Stress Level Zero.

In 2017, Stress Level Zero published Duck Season VR; an experimental first-person narrative based in the summer of 1988. Where the player has a one-day rental of 'Duck Season' to play on their 'Kingbit Entertainment System'. Duck Season VR includes elements of mystery, horror, multiple unique endings, and various minigames.

In 2019, Stress Level Zero published Duck Season PC. Duck Season PC is the full version of 'Duck Season VR', but with no need for a VR headset.

In December 2019, Stress Level Zero published Boneworks; an experimental physics VR adventure developed with the Unity engine.

In February 2020, Stress Level Zero published Boneworks on the Oculus VR Store, along with a temporarily exclusive level called "Tuscany", a level from one of the earliest versions of the Oculus software. It was then released for the Steam version of Boneworks in update 1.4, released April 9, 2020.

On September 29, 2022, Stress Level Zero published Bonelab on the Oculus VR Store and Steam.

References

Living people
American filmmakers
Year of birth missing (living people)